The Melissa Network of Migrant Women in Greece is a Greek not for profit organisation that supports needs of migrant women. It was founded in 2014 by Deborah Carlos-Valencia and Nadina Christopoulo.

Organization 

The Melissa Network is a Greek not for profit organisation that supports needs of migrant women, especially migrants domestic workers in Athens. It was founded in 2014 by Deborah Carlos-Valencia and Nadina Christopoulo. The organization has since grown to include women from 45 countries. The organization is a based in Victoria Square in central Athens, amidst a community where far-right anti-migrant sentiment is high. Services provided include art classes, language classes and other life skills.

Melissa Network's partners include Include HER, Alpha team in Amman, Fintech Capital Network, and the Afghan Women Parliamentarians and Leaders Network.

See also 

 Greek Council of Refugees

 Immigration to Greece
 2015 European migrant crisis

References

External links 

 Melissa Network official website

2014 establishments in Greece
Women's rights organizations
Organizations based in Athens